Rosa multiflora — (syn. Rosa polyantha) is a species of rose known commonly as multiflora rose, baby rose, Japanese rose, many-flowered rose, seven-sisters rose, Eijitsu rose and rambler rose. It is native to eastern Asia, in China, Japan, and Korea. It should not be confused with Rosa rugosa, which is also known as "Japanese rose", or with polyantha roses which are garden cultivars derived from hybrids of R. multiflora. It was introduced to North America, where it is regarded as an invasive species.

Description
The flowers are produced in large corymbs, each flower small,  diameter, white or pink, borne in early summer. The hips are reddish to purple,  diameter.

Two varieties are accepted by the Flora of China:
 Rosa multiflora var. multiflora. Flowers white,  diameter.
 Rosa multiflora var. cathayensis Rehder & E.H.Wilson. Flowers pink, to  diameter.

Cultivation and uses
Rosa multiflora is grown as an ornamental plant and also used as a rootstock for grafted ornamental rose cultivars.

In eastern North America, Rosa multiflora is considered an invasive species. It was originally introduced from Asia as a soil conservation measure, as a natural hedge to border grazing land, and to attract wildlife. It is readily distinguished from American native roses by its large inflorescences, which bear multiple flowers and hips, often more than a dozen, while the American species bear only one or a few on a branch.

In some regions the plant is classified as a noxious weed. In grazing areas, it is generally considered to be a serious pest, though it is considered excellent fodder for goats.

The hips of the plant are edible.

Management
The targeted removal of multiflora rose often requires an aggressive technique, such as the full removal of the plant in addition to the root structure. Pruning and cutting back of the plant often leads to re-sprouting. Two natural biological controls include the rose rosette disease and the rose seed chalid (Megastigmus aculeastus var. nigroflavus). Patches of introduced multiflora rose in Pennsylvania are displaying symptoms of rose rosette disease, which can lead to decline and death.

Gallery

References

External links
 Species Profile – Multiflora Rose, National Invasive Species Information Center, United States National Agricultural Library. Lists general information and resources for Multiflora Rose.

multiflora
Flora of Asia
Flora of Japan
Flora of China
Flora of Korea